Teddi Jo Mellencamp Arroyave (born July 1, 1981) is an American reality television personality, podcast host, and self-professed "accountability coach", best known for being one of the daughters of singer-songwriter John Mellencamp. She appeared as a main cast member in seasons eight, nine, and ten of Bravo's The Real Housewives of Beverly Hills.

Career
In addition to formerly starring on "The Real Housewives of Beverly Hills", Mellencamp is the founder and owner of "All In by Teddi", a lifestyle and fitness company. The company's program has attracted criticism for its lack of transparency and medical supervision, untrained health coaches, and extreme weight loss methods. One of the key criticisms is that the program and menu are the same for everyone who signs up, with a strict meal plan that reportedly involves consuming fewer than 700 calories per day. Subscribers' failure to adhere to the plan, as well as evidence of weight gain, results in immediate dismissal from the program without the chance of a refund (with few exceptions). 

Mellencamp co-hosts a weekly Bravo-centric podcast titled Two T's in a Pod with fellow reality television personality Tamra Judge; the current podcast evolved from Teddi Tea Pod, which covered trends, entertainment, family life and current events. In 2022, Mellencamp was the first HouseGuest to be evicted on the third season of Celebrity Big Brother.

Personal life 
Mellencamp was raised in Hilton Head Island, South Carolina. Mellencamp married filmmaker Matt Robertson in Indiana in June 2006. Mellencamp filed for divorce from Robertson in July 2009, and the divorce was finalized in 2010. In December 2008, Mellencamp met Edwin Arroyave, the CEO of a security company, for what she thought would be a "one-time fling"; they married in 2011. The couple have three children together: son Cruz and daughters Slate and Dove. She is also the stepmother to Isabella, her husband's daughter from a previous marriage. In October 2022, Mellencamp was diagnosed with stage II melanoma, a type of skin cancer, which was promptly removed.

Filmography

References

External links
 Teddi Mellencamp Arroyave at IMDb

Living people
The Real Housewives of Beverly Hills
21st-century American actresses
Pseudoscientific diet advocates
1981 births
Participants in American reality television series
People from Bloomington, Indiana
People from Hilton Head, South Carolina